I Didn't Know You Cared is a British television comedy set in a working-class household in South Yorkshire in the 1970s, written by Peter Tinniswood loosely based upon his books A Touch of Daniel, I Didn't Know You Cared and Except You're a Bird. It was broadcast by the BBC in four series (seven episodes each in series 1, 3 and 4 and six in series 2) from 1975 to 1979.

The main characters are: Carter Brandon (played by Stephen Rea and, in series 3 and 4, Keith Drinkel); his uncle, Uncle Mort (Robin Bailey); his mother, Annie (Liz Smith); his father, Les (John Comer); his girlfriend (later wife), Pat Partington (Anita Carey and, in series 3 and 4, Liz Goulding); and his other uncle, Uncle Staveley (Bert Palmer and, in series 4, Leslie Sarony). Auntie Lil (Gretchen Franklin), appears in the first two series. Other recurring characters, mostly from Carter's workplace, are: Linda Preston (Deirdre Costello); Mrs Partington, Pat's mother (Vanda Godsell); Sid Skelhorn (Ray Dunbobbin and, in series 3 and 4, Bobby Pattinson); and Louis St. John (Paul Barber).

The novels narrate the story of which Carter's thoughts are an integral part. A recurring theme in the books is conversation between Carter and baby Daniel (Uncle Mort's son). One feature of the books is a line at the top of each page which summarizes the developments on that page. The TV series adhere more closely to the conventions of situation comedy, and present generally light-hearted versions of the stories from the books.

In the TV series, Uncle Staveley (remembered for his catchphrase, "I heard that! Pardon?") always appears with the ashes of Corporal Parkinson—one of his comrades from World War I—in a box around his neck.

Peter Tinniswood wrote six further series for BBC Radio 4 featuring members of the Brandon family between 1987 and 1996; two six-episode series each of Uncle Mort's North Country, Uncle Mort's South Country, Uncle Mort's Celtic Fringe. In these series, Stephen Thorne played Uncle Mort, with Peter Skellern as Carter Brandon (Sam Kelly replaced Skellern in South Country and Uncle Mort's Celtic Fringe).

Episodes

Series 1 (1975)

Series 2 (1976)

Series 3 (1978)

Series 4 (1979)

References

External links

BBC television sitcoms
1970s British sitcoms
1975 British television series debuts
1979 British television series endings
English-language television shows
Television shows set in South Yorkshire